Table tennis was contested at the 2011 Summer Universiade from August 13 to August 20 at the Shenzhen Bay Sport Center Gym in Shenzhen, China. Men's and women's singles, men's, women's, and mixed doubles, and men's and women's team events were contested.

Medal summary

Medal table

Events

References

 
2011 Summer Universiade events
Universiade
2011
Table tennis competitions in China